ODN may refer to:
 Optical Distribution Network, the physical fibre and optical devices that distribute signals to users in a telecommunications network.
Ordnance Datum Newlyn, the mean sea-level height datum in Great Britain.
CpG Oligodeoxynucleotide also known as a CpG ODN, a molecule with immunostimulatory properties.
Open DOS Navigator, an orthodox file manager for DOS
Orbital Data Network, a public safety satellite network.